Bad Actress is a 2011 American independent feature film, directed by Robert Lee King, written by David Michael Barrett, produced by Lisa Schahet, and starring Beth Broderick as has-been TV star Alyssa Rampart-Pillage. The picture had its world premiere at the Miami International Film Festival in March, 2011.

A dark comedy, the movie is a retelling of the Greek tragedy Elektra set in the San Fernando Valley. Night-time TV soap queen, Alyssa Rampart-Pillage (Beth Broderick), is a has-been, but her career is restarted once she’s accused of murdering her husband, Bernie (Chris Mulkey), the appliance king of the San Fernando Valley.

Cast 
 Beth Broderick as Alyssa Rampart-Pillage
 Chris Mulkey as Bernie Pillage
 Whitney Able as Rebecca Pillage
 Ryan Hansen as Russell Pillage
 Vincent Ventresca as Morris Pillage
 Andrew Levitas as George Apodaca
 Nathan Lee Graham as Cassandra/Dave
 Keri Lynn Pratt as Topanga Pillage
 Jason Olive as Det. Ray Stoker
 Deborah S. Craig as Det. Pam Rudin
 Corbin Bernsen as himself
 Dee Wallace as herself
 Greg Proops as Barry
 Sean Hankinson as Forensics Coordinator

Production 
Bad Actress, produced by Lisa Schahet of HMO Nurse Productions, had a 24-day shooting schedule. Most of the movie was shot on location in the San Fernando Valley, where the movie takes place. The shooting title for the film was Tarzana, which then changed to (818), and finally to Bad Actress. Screenwriter David Michael Barrett was executive producer, along with Marcus Hu and Jon Gerrans of Strand Releasing.

Awards 
 Best Actress, Beth Broderick at the New York Independent Film Festival for her role as Alyssa Rampart-Pillage, August 2011
 Best Picture, the "10 Degrees Hotter Award," at the Valley Film Festival, November, 2011

Release 
After a successful film festival run launched at the Miami International Film Festival, and screenings worldwide, including the prestigious Cleveland International Film Festival, the movie sold to Strand Releasing, who are distributing the film on Netflix, Hulu, Amazon, iTunes, VOD, DVD and Blu-ray.

References

External links 
 http://movies.rightcelebrity.com/ryan-hansen-party-down-actor/1687
 http://voices.outtakeonline.com/2009/06/cult-filmmakers-twist-on-gay-rights.html
 http://www.washingtonbanglaradio.com/content/22081711-2011-miami-international-film-festival-robert-lee-kings-818-world-premiere
 Interview with director Robert Lee King https://www.youtube.com/watch?v=6GUEDyBK6EM
 http://www.bluetoad.com/publication/?i=71842&p=76
 
 

2011 films
2011 black comedy films
American independent films
Films about dysfunctional families
Films scored by Frederik Wiedmann
American black comedy films
2011 independent films
2010s English-language films
2010s American films